Aleksei Sergeyevich Ionov (born 18 February 1989) is a Russian professional footballer who plays as a winger for Krasnodar and the Russia national team. He can play on the left flank or the right.

Club career

He started playing football at the age of six. Later he graduated from SCYSSOR Zenit, and started playing for Zenit Reserves in 2007.

On 3 June 2013, Ionov moved to Anzhi Makhachkala for 5 million euros.

In June 2016, Ionov moved to CSKA Moscow on a season-long loan.

On 31 August 2017, he signed a 3-year contract with FC Rostov.

On 15 October 2020, he moved to FC Krasnodar and signed a 2.5-year contract with the club.

International career

Ionov was a part of the Russia U-21 side that competed in the 2011 European Under-21 Championship qualification.

He made his senior national team debut on 29 March 2011 in a friendly against Qatar. He played his first competitive national team game in the 2014 FIFA World Cup qualifier against Luxembourg on 6 September 2013.

On 2 June 2014, he was included in the Russia's 2014 FIFA World Cup squad.

After a two-year break, he was called up for games against Turkey and Czech Republic in September 2018. He scored his first two goals for the national squad on 10 September 2018 in a friendly against the Czech Republic which was played at his club's home stadium, Rostov Arena.

On 11 May 2021, he was included in the preliminary extended 30-man squad for UEFA Euro 2020. On 2 June 2021, he was included in the final squad. He did not appear in any games as Russia was eliminated at group stage.

Career statistics

Club

International

International goals
As of match played 19 November 2019. Russia score listed first, score column indicates score after each Ionov goal.

Honours
Zenit St. Petersburg
 UEFA Cup: 2007–08
 Russian Super Cup: 2008, 2011
 Russian Cup: 2009–10
 Russian Premier League: 2010

References

External links
 Profile at the official FC Zenit St. Petersburg website
 

1989 births
People from Kingisepp
Sportspeople from Leningrad Oblast
Living people
Russian footballers
Russia youth international footballers
Russia under-21 international footballers
Russia national football B team footballers
Russia international footballers
Association football wingers
FC Zenit Saint Petersburg players
FC Kuban Krasnodar players
FC Anzhi Makhachkala players
FC Dynamo Moscow players
PFC CSKA Moscow players
FC Rostov players
FC Krasnodar players
Russian Premier League players
UEFA Cup winning players
2014 FIFA World Cup players
UEFA Euro 2020 players